Victory is the fourth studio album by the Swedish death metal band Unleashed. It was released in 1995 on Century Media Records.

Critical reception

In 2005, Victory was ranked number 309 in Rock Hard magazine's book of The 500 Greatest Rock & Metal Albums of All Time.

Track listing
All songs written by Unleashed, unless stated otherwise

Personnel
 Johnny Hedlund – vocals, bass
 Fredrik Lindgren – guitar
 Tomas Olsson – guitar
 Anders Schultz – drums

References

External links
 
 Unleashed band website

1995 albums
Unleashed (band) albums
Century Media Records albums